The twelve-angled stone is an archeological artifact in Cuzco, Peru. It was part of a stone wall of an Inca palace, and is considered to be a national heritage object. The stone is currently part of a wall in the palace of the Archbishop of Cuzco.

Characteristics

The twelve-angled stone is composed of a formation of diorite rocks  and is recognized by its fine finishing and twelve-angled border, an example of perfectionist Incan architecture. The block is categorized as Cultural Heritage of the Nation of Peru and is located in the city of Cuzco, 1105 km from Lima. The stone is a great example of Inca knowledge in the evolution of construction. There are other stones with the same vertices but the twelve-angled stone is the most famous.

As an example of the Incas' advanced stonework, the stone is a popular tourist attraction in Cuzco and a site of pride for many locals. The perfectly cut stone is part of a wall known as the Hatun Rumiyoc, which makes up the outside of the Archbishop's palace.

See also
 Inca architecture
 Inca civilization

References

Ruins in Peru
Inca
Archaeological sites in Peru
Archaeological sites in Cusco Region
Tourist attractions in Cusco Region
Stones